Ondu Kshanadalli is a 2012 Indian Kannada romantic drama film  starring Tarun Chandra, Sanjjanaa and Bhama in the lead roles. The Story, screenplay, dialogues and Direction is by Dinesh Babu. Giridhar Diwan has composed music for the soundtrack, while Goutham Shrivastav has done the background score. Actor-producer Jai Jagadish has produced the venture.

The film made its theatrical release on 5 October 2012 across Karnataka cinema halls.

Plot
The film has two heroines and the hero is not in love with either of them, he says, adding that the film is based on a story that happens on the spur of the moment towards the end of the first half. Tarun Chandra plays the role of Shyam who grows up in another city before he lands in Mysore. Shyam's mother finds a match for him. But Shyam does not want to get hitched. He tries his best to get his marriage cancelled.

Cast
Tarun Chandra as Shyam
Sanjjanaa Galrani as Shilpa
Bhama as Divya
Bhaskar
Sharan
Umesh
Jai Jagadish
Sangeetha

Critical reception

A critic from The Times of India scored the film at 3 out of 5 stars and says "While Tharun Chandra is smart and superb, Sanjana and Bhama excel. But it's the Sharan-Umesh comedy track that clicks throughout the movie. The Jaijagadish-Sangeetha pair is brilliant. Music by Giridhar Divan has some catchy tunes. A movie for the family audience". Srikanth Srinivasa from Rediff.com scored the film at 1.5 out of 5 stars and wrote "Sangeetha, as the mother of Shyam, has done well and so has Jaijagadish as the father. Giridhar Divan has scored good melodious music. Suresh Byrasandra's camerawork is adequate. Ondu Kshanadalli is a somewhat slow and tedious film with some very insipid narration".

Soundtrack

Giridhar Diwan has composed a total of 4 songs. All the songs' lyrics are written by K. Ramnarayan. The Audio has been distributed by Anand Audio.

References

External links 

2012 films
2010s Kannada-language films
Films directed by Dinesh Baboo